Cut Snake is a 2014 Australian thriller film written by Blake Ayshford and directed by Tony Ayres. The title comes from the Australian idiom "mad as a cut snake" which describes either insanity or anger so extreme you don't want to get near it. The film was screened in the Contemporary World Cinema section at the 2014 Toronto International Film Festival.

Plot
“Twentysomething Paula”(Jessica De Gouw) meets Merv (Alex Russell), her “dream boyfriend” out of nowhere. While not knowing anything about Merv's background, Paula approaches marriage with the mysterious Merv. James (Sullivan Stapleton) aka Pommie comes “fresh out of prison in Sydney” and is looking forward to “pick up where he left off with Merv”. Soon after, Paula finds out that “her fiancé, Merv “whom Pommie calls Sparra, spent four years inside [prison] on manslaughter charges”. Little did Paula know that the relationship between these two ex-cons is more than just a fellowship in Prison. The “sexual tension” between Merv and James “hangs in the air like storm clouds”. The presence of James exposes Merv's “criminal history”, jeopardises his future with Paula and brings many conflicts to Merv's emotions. 

“About halfway through Cut Snake there is a twist, which not only ratchets up tension in the plotlines but reshapes the entire perspective of the film. That twist might have been better placed as the trigger for the second act - for some it will arrive too late - though the surprise does play a big part in making Cut Snake a strange and interesting beast.”

Cast
 Sullivan Stapleton as James
 Alex Russell as Merv
 Jessica De Gouw as Paula

Reception
Cut Snake was met with positive reviews from critics and audiences, earning a 69% approval rating based of 16 reviews on Rotten Tomatoes.

Accolades

References

External links

 

2014 films
2014 thriller films
2010s English-language films
Australian thriller films
Australian LGBT-related films
Films directed by Tony Ayres
LGBT-related thriller films